This article is about the tropical cyclones that affected Myanmar. Myanmar has witnessed some of the deadliest storms in the Bay of Bengal. The country is hit by a powerful storm every 1 or 2 years.

The list below contains all storms sorted by their year of formation.

List of storms

References

 
Lists of events in Myanmar
Myanmar
Myanmar history-related lists